Oleg Petrovich Orlov (born April 4, 1953 in Moscow) is a biologist, participator in post-Soviet human rights movements in Russia, chairman of the Board of Human Rights Center “Memorial,” executive board member of the Center's International, Historic-Educational Society. From 2004-2006 was in the President of the Russian Federation's council for the development of civil society and human rights institutions. Laureate of the “For Freedom of Thought” award, given in honor of Andrei Sakharov (2009). Member of the federal political council movement “Solidarity.”

Biography 

Oleg Orlov was born on April 4, 1953 to the Orlov family. His father, Pyotr Mikhailovich, was a graduate of MEPHI (Moscow Engineer Physical Institute) and an engineer; his mother, Svetlana Nikolaevna, was a graduate of MGU (Moscow State University) philological faculty and a school teacher. The 20th convention of the Communist Party Congress, which in 1956 condemned a cult of Stalin worshipers and revealed information on the crimes of Stalin's regime, had a strong impact on Oleg's father. From that time on, according to Oleg Orlov, his father became a determined opponent of communism. In the kitchen of their Moscow apartment many people would often gather to hold political conversations, argue, and listen to songs of bards.

Having not succeeded in getting into MGU on his first try, Oleg Orlov became a student of the agricultural Timiryazevsky Academy. After successfully completing three courses in the academy he transferred to the biology faculty at MGU. Upon finishing his studies he worked for the Institute of Plant Physiology at the Academy of Sciences of the USSR.

During the course of his work at the institute—after the start of the war in Afghanistan in 1979—Orlov made himself a primitive copy machine (hectograph), and for two years posted political leaflets dedicated to the war, the situation in Poland, and the activity of the movement “Solidarity.”

Orlov and Memorial

In 1988 Orlov became a member of the initiative group “Memorial:” a group dedicated to supporting the rehabilitation of victims of political repression in the USSR, publicizing the facts of mass human rights infringements in the USSR, establishing monuments to the victims of political repression, creating a museum and library devoted to the theme of political repression, and freeing of political prisoners.

Subsequently, the All-Union, voluntary, historic-educational society “Memorial” was formed on the basis of the original initiative group. Orlov became the coordinator of the elective committee for “Memorial”. From 1988-1989 he actively participated in the preparatory and founding congresses of “Memorial”. The movement was registered in 1991 and later was renamed to the International Historic-Educational Human Rights and Charity Organization “Memorial”. Orlov became one of the trustees of the organization.

In 1990 Orlov participated in the electoral block “Elections-90” [Vybory-90], was the authorized representative of human rights defender Sergey Kovalev on elections in the Supreme Council of RSFSR, and after his election worked in the administration of the Supreme Council where he held the position of key specialist on a committee for human rights. Orlov worked on laws dealing with the humanization of the penitentiary system in Russia and the rehabilitation of victims of political repression. While occupying this position, Orlov simultaneously became chairman of the Board for the Human Rights Center “Memorial.”

During the coup in Moscow in 1991 Orlov was a defender of “the Russian White House.”

Hotspots in the former USSR and Chechnya

From 1991 to 1994 he was an observer of conflict zones in Armenia, Azerbaijan, Tajikistan, Moldova, and the Ingushetia-Ossetia conflict in the Northern Caucasus. He also co-authored many reports for “Memorial.”
  
Beginning in 1994 Orlov, together with Kovalev, who held the post of chairman of the Committee of Human Rights under the President of Russia, worked in the military conflict zone of the Chechen Republic. He personally met Chechen leaders Dzhokhar Dudaev and Aslan Maskhadov, participated in negotiations to exchange prisoners, and inspected hospitals and camps for prisoners of war.

In June 1995 Oleg Orlov, as part of a group headed by S.A. Kovalev, participated in negotiations with terrorists, who under the direction of Shamil Basaev captured hostages in the city of Budyonovsk. After successful negotiations, members of S.A. Kovalev's group (including Orlov) became voluntary hostages in order to guarantee the agreed-upon exchange of the majority of hostages.

Subsequently, Orlov and Human Rights Center “Memorial” gave much attention to the problem of kidnapping in the Caucasus and victims living among the peaceful populations of the Chechen Republic, Ingushetia and Dagestan. Orlov also refused an offer from Kovalev to work in the presidential human rights structure.

In 2004 Orlov became a member of the President of the Russian Federation's council for the development of civil society and human rights institutions under the leadership of Ella Pamifilova. In 2006 he left the council as a sign of protest against a comment made by Russian president Vladimir Putin concerning the murder of journalist Anna Politkovska, in which he announced that the murder brought Russia a bigger loss than her publications.

Since the beginning of the second Chechen war in October 1999 Orlov has headed the work of “Memorial” in the Northern Caucasus, where representatives of “Memorial” work in Chechnya, Ingushetia, Dagestan, Northern Ossetia, Kabardino-Balkariya, and Stavropolsky territory.

Since April 2004 Orlov has also been a member of the Advisory Council under the Human Rights Commissioner in the Russian Federation.

Attack in Nazran 

On the night of November 24, 2007, the day before a protest in Nazran, Oleg Orlov and a group of TV reporters from REN TV were taken hostages in a Nazran hotel by an armed group of people in masks. While threatening the hostages with their weapons, the kidnappers forced them to wear black bags and drove the hostages outside the city to a field, where they dragged them from the car and began beating them. One of the journalists who suffered through the ordeal later told:

“They beat us silently. After that, one of them said they were going to shoot us now. But then with a snicker he added, ‘It’s a pity we didn’t bring silencers’ and then they left.”

The attackers stole video equipment, documents, cell phones, and personal items from Orlov and the journalists. An hour before the attack the patrol squad that was keeping watch in the Assa Hotel left their post under orders from their superiors. The car with the hostages was not stopped once along the way. Oleg Orlov and the other victims are convinced they were attacked by officers of special services and that the attack itself was “an act of intimidation.”

According to the facts of the attack a court case was drawn up under three articles of the Criminal Code of the Russian Federation (UKRF): “hindrance of lawful professional work of journalists” (item 144, part 1 UKRF), “illegal penetration into a dwelling with application of violence” (item 139, part 2 UKRF), and “theft – open plunder of another’s property” (item 161, part 1 UKRF). A group of well-known Russian human rights activists appealed to the Human Rights Commissioner in Russia, Vladimir Lukin, and to Ella Pamfilova, the Chairman of the President of the Russian Federation's council for the development of civil society and human rights institutions. In their appeal they pointed out the inaccuracy in the particulars of the court case:

“The investigators ‘did not make note’ that ‘kidnapping’ (item 126), ‘threat by murder’ (item 119), ‘assault’ (item 116), and ‘deliberate harm to health’ (item 112) took place. A one-and-a-half hour run wearing only socks in freezing cold weather is already a sufficient basis to begin speaking of inhuman treatment to victims. Finally, ‘plunder of property with application of violence’ is not qualified as ‘theft’, but as ‘robbery’ (item 162 UKRF).”

Kadyrov’s Lawsuit 
 
In 2009 Orlov placed blame for the murder of “Memorial” employee Natalya Estemirova, which took place in July 2009, on the head of the President of the Chechen Republic, Ramzan Kadyrov. In response to this, Kadyrov filed suit against Orlov and HRC “Memorial” in order to protect his honor, dignity, business reputation, and to receive compensation for moral injury. On October 6, 2009 the judge partly satisfied Kadyrov's claim, collecting 20 thousand Rubles from Orlov and 50 thousand Rubles from “Memorial.” The judge viewed the statements from Orlov about the personal or indirect fault of Kadyrov in the death of Estemirova as discrediting the honor and dignity of the President. Orlov specified that he did not mean that Kadyrov himself had directly participated in the crime, but that he was responsible for what was happening in the republic. Orlov pointed out that the head of the Chechen Republic had created such conditions as to make it impossible for human rights activists to work in the republic; and what's more—they (human rights activists) are declared as “permitted targets.” The Commissioner of Human Rights in the Chechen Republic—Nurdi Nukhazhiev—announced that Orlov “got off easy.” According to Nukhazhiev, “He (Orlov), in his biased statements, has publicly disgraced the honor, dignity, and business reputation … of Kadyrov. And in such situations the judge should be more severe.” 
On June 6, 2010, for that same public statement, Orlov was accused of a criminal offense for “slander” (item 129, part 3 UKRF). 
Orlov's court process began on September 13, 2010. Genry Markovich Reznik became his lawyer. The state accuser asked that Orlov be found guilty and fined 150 thousand rubles. The representative of Kadyrov demanded a punishment of 3 years imprisonment. On June 14, 2011 magistrate of the court district No.363 of the Khamoviki region of Moscow declared Orlov “not guilty.” Kadyrov's representative, as well as the state prosecutor, has appealed against this verdict. The consideration of appeals still continues today.

References 

1953 births
Living people
Scientists from Moscow
Moscow State University alumni
Russian activists against the 2022 Russian invasion of Ukraine
Russian biologists
Russian human rights activists